Melvin Foster (born February 23, 1971 in Washington, DC) is an American former heavyweight boxer best known for his amateur boxing career. He most notably defeated former world champion Mike Weaver and two-time title challenger Carl Williams.

Professional career
Known as "Top Gun", Foster turned pro in 1992 and remained undefeated until losing to Trevor Berbick in 1994.  The following year he dropped a decision to Michael Moorer, and after the loss his once promising career began to sour, and he morphed into a journeyman fighter.  He went on to lose bouts to Jimmy Thunder, Corey Sanders, Hasim Rahman, Derrick Jefferson, and Cedric Boswell.  He retired in 2005 after a TKO loss to Eddie Chambers.

Professional boxing record

|-
|align="center" colspan=8|24 Wins (18 knockouts, 6 decisions), 13 Losses (8 knockouts, 5 decisions), 1 Draw 
|-
| align="center" style="border-style: none none solid solid; background: #e3e3e3"|Result
| align="center" style="border-style: none none solid solid; background: #e3e3e3"|Record
| align="center" style="border-style: none none solid solid; background: #e3e3e3"|Opponent
| align="center" style="border-style: none none solid solid; background: #e3e3e3"|Type
| align="center" style="border-style: none none solid solid; background: #e3e3e3"|Round
| align="center" style="border-style: none none solid solid; background: #e3e3e3"|Date
| align="center" style="border-style: none none solid solid; background: #e3e3e3"|Location
| align="center" style="border-style: none none solid solid; background: #e3e3e3"|Notes
|-align=center
|Loss
|
|align=left| Eddie Chambers
|TKO
|5
|22/04/2005
|align=left| Philadelphia, Pennsylvania, U.S.
|align=left|
|-
|Win
|
|align=left| Willie Perryman
|KO
|3
|05/02/2005
|align=left| Washington, D.C., U.S.
|align=left|
|-
|Loss
|
|align=left| Cedric Boswell
|UD
|8
|22/09/2002
|align=left| Friant, California, U.S.
|align=left|
|-
|Loss
|
|align=left| Danell Nicholson
|TKO
|4
|18/01/2002
|align=left| Las Vegas, Nevada, U.S.
|align=left|
|-
|Loss
|
|align=left| Faruq Saleem
|SD
|10
|08/12/2001
|align=left| Wilmington, Delaware, U.S.
|align=left|
|-
|Loss
|
|align=left| Derrick Jefferson
|TKO
|4
|10/09/1999
|align=left| Mount Pleasant, Michigan, U.S.
|align=left|
|-
|Loss
|
|align=left| Garing Lane
|UD
|8
|30/07/1999
|align=left| Biloxi, Mississippi, U.S.
|align=left|
|-
|Win
|
|align=left| Jade Scott
|UD
|10
|18/12/1998
|align=left| Fort Lauderdale, Florida, U.S.
|align=left|
|-
|Win
|
|align=left| Mike Weaver
|TKO
|9
|08/08/1998
|align=left| Spirit Lake, North Dakota, U.S.
|align=left|
|-
|Loss
|
|align=left| Hasim Rahman
|TKO
|2
|14/03/1998
|align=left| Moscow, Russia
|align=left|
|-
|Loss
|
|align=left| Corey Sanders
|TKO
|6
|09/01/1998
|align=left| Atlantic City, New Jersey, U.S.
|align=left|
|-
|Loss
|
|align=left| Robert Hawkins
|TKO
|10
|20/05/1997
|align=left| Lyndhurst, New Jersey, U.S.
|align=left|
|-
|Loss
|
|align=left| Jeff Wooden
|TKO
|7
|15/10/1996
|align=left| Atlantic City, New Jersey, U.S.
|align=left|
|-
|Win
|
|align=left| David Smith
|TKO
|2
|26/04/1996
|align=left| Westbury, New York, U.S.
|align=left|
|-
|Loss
|
|align=left| Jimmy Thunder
|TKO
|8
|03/10/1995
|align=left| Mashantucket, Connecticut, U.S.
|align=left|
|-
|Win
|
|align=left| Carlton West
|TKO
|2
|30/08/1995
|align=left| Washington, D.C., U.S.
|align=left|
|-
|Loss
|
|align=left| Michael Moorer
|UD
|10
|13/05/1995
|align=left| Sacramento, California, U.S.
|align=left|
|-
|Win
|
|align=left| Mike Dixon
|TKO
|8
|28/04/1995
|align=left| Westbury, New York, U.S.
|align=left|
|-
|Win
|
|align=left| Carl Williams
|PTS
|10
|17/03/1995
|align=left| Bushkill, Pennsylvania, U.S.
|align=left|
|-
|Win
|
|align=left| Ron Gullette
|KO
|3
|11/01/1995
|align=left| Woodlawn, Maryland, U.S.
|align=left|
|-
|Win
|
|align=left| Jimmy Harrison
|KO
|6
|22/10/1994
|align=left| Washington, D.C., U.S.
|align=left|
|-
|Loss
|
|align=left| Trevor Berbick
|SD
|10
|13/09/1994
|align=left| Westbury, New York, U.S.
|align=left|
|-
|Win
|
|align=left| Mitch Green
|PTS
|10
|02/06/1994
|align=left| Melville, New York, U.S.
|align=left|
|-
|Win
|
|align=left| Bruce Johnson
|TKO
|2
|23/04/1994
|align=left| Washington, D.C., U.S.
|align=left|
|-
|Win
|
|align=left| Martin Foster
|UD
|10
|22/03/1994
|align=left| Pensacola, Florida, U.S.
|align=left|
|-
|Win
|
|align=left| Mike Whitfield
|UD
|8
|17/02/1994
|align=left| Upper Marlboro, Maryland, U.S.
|align=left|
|-
|Draw
|
|align=left| Martin Foster
|PTS
|8
|28/01/1994
|align=left| Kingston, New York, U.S.
|align=left|
|-
|Win
|
|align=left| Ron Gullette
|TKO
|2
|12/10/1993
|align=left| Virginia Beach, Virginia, U.S.
|align=left|
|-
|Win
|
|align=left| George Harris
|KO
|2
|25/09/1993
|align=left| Erie, Pennsylvania, U.S.
|align=left|
|-
|Win
|
|align=left| Lazaro Almanza
|TKO
|3
|16/07/1993
|align=left| Melville, New York, U.S.
|align=left|
|-
|Win
|
|align=left| Gary Poole
|TKO
|2
|02/07/1993
|align=left| Washington, D.C., U.S.
|align=left|
|-
|Win
|
|align=left| Webster Vinson
|TKO
|2
|18/06/1993
|align=left| White Plains, New York, U.S.
|align=left|
|-
|Win
|
|align=left| Eugene Adams
|TKO
|3
|21/05/1993
|align=left| Uniondale, New York, U.S.
|align=left|
|-
|Win
|
|align=left|Ed McCarroll
|KO
|1
|26/03/1993
|align=left| Erie, Pennsylvania, U.S.
|align=left|
|-
|Win
|
|align=left|Frank July
|KO
|1
|19/02/1993
|align=left| Washington, D.C., U.S.
|align=left|
|-
|Win
|
|align=left| Charles Brooks
|KO
|1
|09/12/1992
|align=left| Virginia Beach, Virginia, U.S.
|align=left|
|-
|Win
|
|align=left| Don Johnson
|KO
|1
|29/11/1992
|align=left| Washington, D.C., U.S.
|align=left|
|-
|Win
|
|align=left| Nelson Garcia
|PTS
|4
|23/10/1992
|align=left| Hauppauge, New York, U.S.
|align=left|
|}

Amateur career
National Golden Gloves Heavyweight Champion (1991)

Ohio State Fair Runner-Up to "Iceman" John Scully, 165 pounds (1987)

External links
 

1971 births
Living people
Boxers from Washington, D.C.
Heavyweight boxers
National Golden Gloves champions
American male boxers